The August G. and Theresa Green House is a historic house located at 1501 Main Street in Stevens Point, Wisconsin, USA.

Description and history 
The house is designed in the Queen Anne style, as exhibited by its steep, irregularly shaped roof, its wide porch with classical columns, and its conical corner tower. It was added to the National Register of Historic Places on June 1, 2005.

References

Houses in Portage County, Wisconsin
Houses on the National Register of Historic Places in Wisconsin
Queen Anne architecture in Wisconsin
National Register of Historic Places in Portage County, Wisconsin
Houses completed in 1903